Yi O is a village on Lantau Island, Hong Kong.

Administration
Yi O is a recognized village under the New Territories Small House Policy.

See also
 Lantau Trail
 Peaked Hill (Hong Kong)

References

External links
 Delineation of area of existing village Yi O (Tai O) for election of resident representative (2019 to 2022)

Villages in Islands District, Hong Kong
Lantau Island